Fabiana "Dara" Carvalho Carneiro Diniz (born 13 May 1981) is a retired Brazilian handball player. She played on the Brazilian national team and participated at the 2011 World Women's Handball Championship in Brazil and the 2012 Summer Olympics.

Achievements
Austrian League:
Winner: 2013
Austrian Cup:
Winner: 2013, 2014
EHF Cup Winners' Cup
 Winner: 2013
World Championship:
Winner: 2013
Pan American Games:
Winner: 2003, 2007, 2011
Pan American Championship:
Winner: 2005, 2007, 2011, 2013, 2015
Silver Medalist: 2009
South American Championship:
Winner: 2013

References

External links 
 
 
 

1981 births
Living people
Brazilian female handball players
Olympic handball players of Brazil
Handball players at the 2012 Summer Olympics
Handball players at the 2016 Summer Olympics
Pan American Games medalists in handball
Pan American Games gold medalists for Brazil
Handball players at the 2003 Pan American Games
Handball players at the 2007 Pan American Games
Handball players at the 2011 Pan American Games
Expatriate handball players
Brazilian expatriate sportspeople in Austria
Brazilian expatriate sportspeople in France
Brazilian expatriate sportspeople in Germany
Brazilian expatriate sportspeople in Spain
People from Guaratinguetá
Medalists at the 2007 Pan American Games
Medalists at the 2011 Pan American Games
Sportspeople from São Paulo (state)
21st-century Brazilian women